Lafayette Ronald Hubbard (March 13, 1911 – January 24, 1986), better known as L. Ron Hubbard, was an American pulp fiction author. He wrote in a wide variety of genres, including science fiction, fantasy, adventure fiction, aviation, travel, mystery, western, and romance. His United States publisher and distributor is Galaxy Press. He is perhaps best known for his self-help book, the #1 New York Times bestseller Dianetics: The Modern Science of Mental Health (first published in 1950), and as the founder of the Church of Scientology.

L. Ron Hubbard was a prolific writer; according to the church, his written teachings make up approximately 500,000 pages and 3,000 recorded lectures, totaling about 65 million words. He also produced a hundred films and 500 short stories and novels.

Early writings

Although he was best known for his pulp fantasy and science fiction, Hubbard also wrote adventure, aviation, travel, mystery, western and romance. He wrote under his own name and as Kurt von Rachen and René Lafayette, his principal science fiction/fantasy pseudonyms. His other pen names included "Winchester Remington Colt" (rather obviously reserved for Westerns), Lt Jonathan Daly, Capt Charles Gordon, Bernard Hubbel, Michael Keith, Legionnaire 148, Legionnaire 14830, Ken Martin, Scott Morgan or Lt Scott Morgan, Barry Randolph and Capt Humbert Reynolds."

Hubbard's first short story, "Tah", was published in the Literary Supplement of The Hatchet, George Washington University's campus paper, in February 1932. In February 1934, the pulp magazine Thrilling Adventure was the first to publish one of Hubbard's short stories. Over the next six years, more than 140 of his short stories appeared in similar magazines devoted to high adventure and mystery.

Hubbard began publishing Science Fiction with the magazine Astounding in 1938, and over the next decade he was a prolific contributor to both Astounding and the fantasy fiction magazine Unknown. However, despite efforts by later supporters to assign to Hubbard a central role in the creation of modern science fiction, he was not a member of the small group of prime movers—L Sprague de Camp, Robert A Heinlein and Isaac Asimov—in the genre.

Dianetics and Scientology

Hubbard's first major financial success came with the publication of Dianetics in 1950, after which he departed the field of science fiction writing for many years. In 1951, he refashioned the material of Dianetics into Scientology. At this time, he established his first publishing organization, devoted exclusively to his own works, and used it (and its later incarnations) to publish his own "spiritual technology," as well as his ideas about business administration, literacy, and drug rehabilitation.

Hubbard returned to the field of Science Fiction writing in 1982 with the publication of Battlefield Earth, followed by the Mission Earth "dekalogy," a ten-volume series, most of which was published posthumously.

Output and reception

Hubbard produced more than 250 published works of fiction in his writing career. At his peak, he wrote “over 100,000 words a month.”  He is remembered for his “prodigious output" and the "amazing speed at which he could produce copy.” He used a special electric IBM typewriter with extra keys for common words like ‘and’, ‘the’, and ‘but.’

Scientology's publishing arm has translated his work into seventy-two languages. His fiction and non-fiction books have sold millions of copies, and Hubbard holds four Guinness World Records for “Most Published Works by One Author”, “Most Audio Books Published for One Author”, “Most Translated Author in the World”, and "Most Translated Author, Same Book" (The Way to Happiness).

Criticism of Hubbard's fiction is mixed. Georges T. Dodds, columnist for WARP, newsletter/fanzine of the Montreal Science Fiction and Fantasy association writes, "much of [Hubbard's]science fiction and fantasy is quite entertaining, and in most cases as good or better than much of the pulp literature of the era." A reviewer for Publishers Weekly emphasizes "Hubbard's ability to pack an epic into relatively few pages -- this is indeed golden science fiction from the Golden Age.". The Encyclopedia of Science Fiction maintains that science fiction "was clearly not Hubbard's forte, and most of his work in the genre reads as tendentious or laboured or both. As a writer of fantasy, however, [Hubbard] wrote with an occasionally pixillated fervour that is still pleasing, and sometimes reminiscent of the screwball comedies popular in the 1930s cinema."

Encyclopedia of Science Fiction says about Hubbard's last foray into the genre of science fiction: "Battlefield Earth: A Saga of the Year 3000 (1982), [is] an enormously long space opera composed in an idiom that seemed embarrassingly archaic. This was followed by the Mission Earth 'dekalogy,' a ten-volume sequence whose farcical over-egging of a seriously thin narrative thread fails to disguise a tale that would have been more at home in the dawn of the Pulp magazines, though its length would not have been tolerated."

Controversy

While nineteen of Hubbard's books have appeared on the New York Times bestseller list, New York Times rival paper, the Los Angeles Times printed an article questioning the validity of such sales. The New York Times is quoted in the same article, "the newspaper uncovered no instances in which vast quantities of books were being sold to single individuals." Adding further, "Science fiction and self-improvement books have always been big sellers in America, and Hubbard’s works have long had a strong following."

Hollywood connection

Hubbard is credited with writing the story on which The Secret of Treasure Island, a 1938 Columbia Pictures movie serial, was based, as well as the story on which one episode of the TV show Tales of Wells Fargo (1957) was based.

Best-known fiction

This is a partial list of Hubbard's published works of fiction. Included are Fear, To the Stars, Final Blackout and Typewriter in the Sky, which were published in 1940 and reprinted numerous times. To the Stars was published in Astounding Science Fiction magazine in 1950. Hubbard had a total of 235 works of fiction published. Reprinted titles, reprinted by publisher Galaxy Press, include The Iron Duke, Hostage to Death, Cargo of Coffins, Brass Keys to Murder, and Under the Black Ensign.

War-ravaged Europe is the setting of Final Blackout, which Pau Walker described as "a bleak, harsh novel of hopeless conflict and an idealistic lieutenant who fights it to its ironic end." A similar grim irony pervades Death's Deputy, in which an immortal, voided to punish humans according to the whims of his race, seeks in vain his own death. The short novels Typewriter in the Sky and Fear (Hubbard novella) are horrific fantasies which many critics consider to be classics of the science fiction's golden age. Fear, which relates the existence of a man who alternates between psychosis and sanity, is considered among Hubbard's finest works. Hubbard's last book of this period, Return to Tomorrow, is a "space opera" which anticipates future science fiction themes in its story about intergalactic traders from whom one month equals a century of Earth time. Hubbard's stories written under the pseudonym of Rene Lafayette and collected in Ole Doc Methuselah (1970) relate the tales of a medical doctor who traverses time and space while opposing criminals and enemies for his profession.

Battlefield Earth 
Battlefield Earth is a 1982 science fiction novel written by Hubbard. He composed a soundtrack to the book called Space Jazz. Initially titled Man, the Endangered Species, Battlefield Earth was first published in 1982 by St. Martin's Press, though all subsequent reprintings have been by Church of Scientology publishing companies Bridge Publications and Galaxy Press. Written in the style of the pulp fiction era (during which Hubbard began his writing career), the novel is over 750 pages in hardcover and 1000+ in paperback. It was Hubbard's first openly science fiction novel since his pulp magazine days of the 1940s, and it was promoted as Hubbard's "return" to science fiction after a long hiatus.

The Magazine of Fantasy & Science Fiction described the book as a "rather good, fast-paced, often fascinating SF adventure yarn." The fantasy author Neil Gaiman wrote, "For value for money I have to recommend L. Ron Hubbard's massive Battlefield Earth - over 1000 pages of thrills, spills, vicious aliens, noble humans. Is mankind an endangered species? Will handsome and heroic Jonny Goodboy Tyler win Earth back from the nine-foot-high Psychlos? A tribute to the days of Pulp, I found it un-put-downable. And all for £2.95". Frederik Pohl said, "I read 'Battlefield Earth' straight through in one sitting although it's immense... I was fascinated by it." Kevin J. Anderson says, "Battlefield Earth is like a 12-hour 'Indiana Jones' marathon. Non-stop and fast-paced. Every chapter has a big bang-up adventure." Publishers Weekly said about the novel, "This has everything: suspense, pathos, politics, war, humor, diplomacy and intergalactic finance..." Science fiction author A. E. van Vogt stated, "Wonderful adventure ... great characters ... a masterpiece." but later admitted that he had not actually read it due to its size.

Battlefield Earth went to the top of the New York Times Best Seller list and also those of the Los Angeles Times, TIME, United Press International, Associated Press, B. Dalton's and Waldenbooks. According to Hubbard's literary agents, Author Services Inc., by June 1983 the book had sold 150,000 copies and earned $1.5 million.

The book was adapted for film in 2000, and retains a cult status, despite bombing at the box office and being critically panned.

To the Stars 
To the Stars was first published in book format in 1954 under the title Return to Tomorrow, and was first published in hardcover in 1975 under the same title.  The book was generally positively received, and garnered a 2001 nomination for a "Retro" Hugo Award for Best Novella. Publishers Weekly gave the book a positive review, calling it one of Hubbard's "finest works", and Alan Cheuse highlighted the work on National Public Radio's program All Things Considered as a top literature holiday pick.

Galaxy reviewer Groff Conklin described the 1954 edition as "a fast-paced and grim adventure . . . just short of absurdity, but interesting nevertheless." Anthony Boucher panned the novel, calling it "a surprisingly routine and plotless space opera."

Buckskin Brigades 
Buckskin Brigades was Hubbard's first hard-covered book, and his first published novel. Hubbard incorporates historical background from the Blackfeet tribe into the book. The book was re-released by Bridge Publications in a 1987 edition. The book was published in an audio book format by Bridge Publications and read by actor Bruce Boxleitner, who was hired by Church of Spiritual Technology subsidiary Author Services Inc. to read Hubbard's books on tape. The New York Times stated that, "Mr. Hubbard has reversed a time-honored formula and has given a thriller to which, at the end of every chapter or so, another paleface bites the dust . . . (has) an enthusiasm, even a freshness and sparkle, decidedly rare in this type of romance."

Some sources state that as a young man, Hubbard became a blood brother to the Piegan Blackfeet Native American tribe while living in Montana, though this claim is disputed. Hubbard incorporates historical background from the Blackfeet tribe into the book.

Death's Deputy 
Death’s Deputy was first published in book form, in 1948, by Fantasy Publishing Company, Inc. The novel originally appeared in the February 1940 issue of the magazine Unknown.

Fear 
Fear is a psychological thriller-horror novella by Hubbard first appearing in Unknown Fantasy Fiction in July 1940. Stephen King called the book, "A classic tale of creeping, surreal menace and horror." This is possibly Hubbard's most critically acclaimed novel, receiving positive reviews from the likes of Isaac Asimov and Ray Bradbury.

Final Blackout 
Final Blackout was first published in serialized format in 1940 in the science fiction magazine Astounding Science Fiction. It was published in book form in 1948 by The Hadley Publishing Co. Author Services Inc. published a hardcover edition of the book in 1988, and in 1989 the Church of Scientology-affiliated organization Bridge Publications announced that film director Christopher Cain had signed a contract to write and direct a movie version based on the book. Final Blackout and Fear are often cited by critics as the best examples of Hubbard's pulp fiction works.  Robert Heinlein called the book “as perfect a piece of Science Fiction as has ever been written." Chuck Moss of Daily News of Los Angeles called the book "extremely good science fiction". The book has been included in the curriculum of a science-fiction writing class at California State Polytechnic University, Pomona. Karl Edward Wagner cited Final Blackout as one of the thirteen best science-fiction horror novels.

Kingslayer 
Kingslayer is a collection of science fiction short stories by Hubbard. It was first published in 1949 by Fantasy Publishing Company, Inc. in an edition of 1,200 copies. The title story first appeared in this collection. The other stories had previously appeared in the magazine Astounding.

Ole Doc Methuselah 
Ole Doc Methuselah, published in 1970, is a collection of science fiction short stories by Hubbard originally published in Astounding Science Fiction from 1947 to 1950.

Slaves of Sleep 
Slaves of Sleep was first published in book form, in 1948, by Shasta Publishers, and originally appeared in 1939 in an issue of the magazine Unknown.

Typewriter in the Sky 
Typewriter in the Sky was well received. The Philadelphia Inquirer called it "swashbuckling fun", and John Clute and John Grant in The Encyclopedia of Fantasy characterized the work as the best of Hubbard's stories from the Arabian-fantasy theme.

Mission Earth 
Mission Earth is an epic science fiction novel, split into ten volumes of unequal length.
Each volume was a New York Times bestseller. The ten volumes of the Mission Earth series, all bar the first of which were published posthumously, comprise The Invaders Plan (1985), Black Genesis: Fortress of Evil, The Enemy Within, An Alien Affair, Fortune Of Fear, Death Quest (1986), Voyage Of Vengeance, Disaster, Villainy Victorious, and The Doomed Planet (1987).

L. Ron Hubbard Writers Award Contest
Established and sponsored by Hubbard in 1983, the "Writers Award Contest" is a competition aimed at discovering, and eventually publishing, deserving amateur and aspiring writers. To enter, a writer must not have professionally published more than three short stories or more than one novelette. There is no entry fee and the entrant retains all rights to their work. The L. Ron Hubbard Gold Award, a trophy with a gold quill and star set in red-based lucite, is presented to the annual Grand Prize winner, selected from among the four first-place quarterly winners, and includes a $5,000 prize. To date, the “Writers of the Future Program” has become one of the largest, most well known and best-established discovery vehicles in the field. Winners have gone on to publish over 700 novels and 3,000 short stories, have appeared on international bestseller lists,  has launched the careers of hundreds of authors, and even eight New York Times bestsellers.

L. Ron Hubbard Illustrators of the Future Contest
The L. Ron Hubbard Illustrators of the Future Contest was launched in 1988. The Contest awards three winners each quarter, and has them illustrate a winning story from the Writers of the Future Contest. These rendered illustrations are entered in the Grand Prize competition and published in the L. Ron Hubbard Presents Writers of the Future anthology with their respective companion story. All themes of science fiction and fantasy illustrations are welcome in the contest. Contestants are not required to pay an entry fee and the artist retains all rights in the entry.

Bibliography
See: L. Ron Hubbard bibliography

References

External links

Official L. Ron Hubbard author site
L. Ron Hubbard on IMDB

L. Ron Hubbard
Works by L. Ron Hubbard